Gary Jonland (born June 21, 1952) is an American speed skater. He competed in the men's 1500 metres event at the 1972 Winter Olympics.

References

External links
 

1952 births
Living people
American male speed skaters
Olympic speed skaters of the United States
Speed skaters at the 1972 Winter Olympics
Speed skaters from Chicago